The Open de Rouen is a WTA 125-level professional women's tennis tournament. It takes place on indoor hard courts, in the month of October at the Kindarena in the city of Rouen in France . The prize money is $115,000.

Results

Singles

Doubles

See also
 L'Open 35 de Saint-Malo
 Trophee Lagardere
 Grand Est Open 88
 Open Angers Arena Loire
 Open de Limoges

References

Tennis tournaments in France
Hard court tennis tournaments
WTA 125 tournaments
Annual events in France
2022 establishments in Italy
Recurring sporting events established in 2022